Amblyoponinae is a subfamily of ants in the poneromorph subfamilies group containing 13 extant genera and one extinct genus. The ants in this subfamily are mostly specialized subterranean predators. Adult workers pierce the integument (non lethally) of their larvae and pupa to imbibe haemolymph, earning them the common name Dracula ant.

Identification
Amblyoponinae is characterized by these worker characters: eyes small or absent, situated behind midlength of side of head; anterior margin of clypeus with specialized dentiform setae; promesonotal suture flexible; petiole very broadly attached to abdominal segment 3 and without a distinct posterior face; postpetiole absent; sting present and well developed.

Systematics
The subfamily was formerly considered a tribe within Ponerinae, but was elevated to its own subfamily in 2003 when Barry Bolton divided Ponerinae into six subfamilies.

Amblyoponinae Forel, 1893
 Amblyoponini Forel, 1893
 Adetomyrma Ward, 1994
 Amblyopone Erichson, 1842
 †Casaleia Pagliano & Scaramozzino, 1990
 Fulakora Mann, 1919
 Myopopone Roger, 1861
 Mystrium Roger, 1862
 Onychomyrmex Emery, 1895
 Prionopelta Mayr, 1866
 Stigmatomma Roger, 1859
 Xymmer Santschi, 1914

References

External links

https://www.youtube.com/watch?v=KgqK0hrZ9kM

 
Ant subfamilies
Extant Lutetian first appearances